Czech Movie Heaven (in Czech České filmové nebe, ČFN) was founded in 1995 by Radek Vetešník and Petr Herudek to be a comprehensive website of Czech and Slovak language movies, covering the whole history since silent era.

 5,421 movies and 23,154 people are recorded.

See also
 List of films made in First Republic of Czechoslovakia

External links
 ČFN website

Czech 
Online film databases
Internet properties established in 1995